Luke Alexander Webb (born 31 December 1995) is an English first-class cricketer.

Webb was born at Stoke Mandeville in Buckinghamshire in December 1995, and educated at Gillingham School. He made his debut in minor counties cricket for Dorset, when he played against Shropshire in the Minor Counties Championship. He later studied at Oxford Brookes University, where he made his debut in first-class cricket in April 2015 for Oxford MCCU against Worcestershire; he played a further first-class match later that month against Middlesex. Webb didn't feature for Oxford MCCU in first-class cricket in 2016 or 2017, but did feature in 2018, playing in one match against Kent at Canterbury. Across his three first-class appearances, he scored a total of 68 runs, with a high score of 32. He has featured in all three formats of minor counties cricket for Dorset.

References

External links

1995 births
Living people
People from Aylesbury Vale
People educated at Gillingham Grammar School, Dorset
Alumni of Oxford Brookes University
English cricketers
Dorset cricketers
Oxford MCCU cricketers